Koorküla Valgjärv is a lake in Tõrva Parish, Valga County, Estonia. The lake is one of the deepest in Estonia.

See also
List of lakes of Estonia

References

Tõrva Parish
Lakes of Valga County